Torre Canavese (Piedmontese: La Tor Bèr) is a comune (municipality) in the Metropolitan City of Turin in the Italian region Piedmont, located about  north of Turin.

Torre Canavese borders the following municipalities: Castellamonte, Quagliuzzo, Strambinello, Baldissero Canavese, San Martino Canavese, Bairo, and Agliè.

Torre Canavese is a city in the province of Torino in Northern Italy. Torre means tower in Italy, in this case, "Torre" refers to the tower on the city's castle. Torre is an agricultural town in which many of the residents grow their own fruits and vegetables. Within the confines of Torre, there is a castle and a Catholic church, the church tower was built by Savino Barello. Each year on Fat Tuesday there is a town gathering at the bar where the citizens gather and eat beans—cooked in a terra cotta pot over an open flame—and soup. The weather ranges from the 90s in the summer to the mid-20s in the winter. Because Torre is located in the Pre-Alps the city can have a few feet of snow in the winter.

Demographic evolution

Curiosity
In Torre Canavese in 2009 the set designer Massimo Antonello Geleng created a theme park called Viassa Felliniana and dedicated to the director Federico Fellini.
(Info by the Dizionario del Turismo Cinematografico)

References

External links
 Official website

Cities and towns in Piedmont